USS APL-15 is an APL-2-class barracks ship of the United States Navy.

Construction and career
The ship was laid down on 29 October 1943, by the Nashville Bridge Co. and launched on 29 January 1944. She was commissioned on 1 August 1944.

From 26 August to 2 November 1944, she was towed by WSA tug Scotch Cap from New Orleans to Pearl Harbor.

The ship was assigned to Naval Base Guam from March 1945 to 17 May 1946.

She was decommissioned on 17 May 1946 and put into the reserve fleet by January 1947.

The ship undertook the CincPacFlt Berthing and Messing Program, in which she is berthed in San Diego since at least the early 2000s. She is being used as a berthing and messing barge.

Awards 
Asiatic–Pacific Campaign Medal
World War II Victory Medal
National Defense Service Medal
American Campaign Medal

References

 

Barracks ships of the United States Navy
Ships built in Tennessee
1944 ships